Coleophora romieuxi is a moth of the family Coleophoridae. It is found in the Democratic Republic of Congo.

References

romieuxi
Insects of the Democratic Republic of the Congo
Moths of Africa
Moths described in 2005
Endemic fauna of the Democratic Republic of the Congo